Su-aoxin Station or Su-ao New is a railway station on the Taiwan Railways Administration Yilan line located in Su'ao Township, Yilan County, Taiwan. It is an intersegmental station of Yilan line continued to Su'ao and the northern terminus of North-link line. The station was opened on 15 April 1968.

There are two island platforms and multiple tracks.

See also
 List of railway stations in Taiwan

References

External links

 TRA Su'aoxin Station 
 TRA Su'aoxin Station 

1968 establishments in Taiwan
Railway stations in Yilan County, Taiwan
Railway stations opened in 1968
Railway stations served by Taiwan Railways Administration